Yukti Kapoor is an Indian television actress best known for portraying Urmila in Siya Ke Ram and Ragini Singh in Agniphera and S.I. Karishma Singh in Maddam Sir.

Personal life 
In April 2022, Kapoor stated that she is in a happy relationship.

Career

Debut and breakthrough (2010-2018)
Kapoor made her acting debut in 2010 with Nanhi Si Kali Meri Laadli where she was seen as Guddi. She subsequently appeared as Tanu Chauhan in Jhilmil Sitaaron Ka Aangan Hoga, Bittoo in Pyaar Ka Dard Hai Meetha Meetha Pyaara Pyaara and Mayura Dunavati in Yeh Hai Mohabbatein in 2013. In the same year, she made her film debut with the Bhojpuri film Ka Ukhaad Leba where she played Mona Bai.

In 2015, she made her Hindi film debut with Uvaa. Later in the same year, she landed her first major role in Star Plus's Siya Ke Ram, where she portrayed Urmila opposite Karan Suchak.

In 2016, she played the role of Sudha Shekhwat in Balika Vadhu.

In 2017, she played one of the protagonist Ragini Singh in Agnifera alongside Ankit Gera and Simran Kaur.

Success and further career (2019-present)
Agnifera took a leap in 2018, after which she portrayed her character's on-screen daughter Agni Singh Thakur alongside Samridh Bawa and Kaur(coincidentally portraying Kaur's earlier character's daughter) till 2019. Later, Kapoor played Swetha in an episode of Laal Ishq with Vikram Sakhalkar. The same year, she portrayed Lakshmi, Alakshmi and Matrikas in Namah alongside Savi Thakur.

In 2020, she appeared in her first music video Fakiri. Since 2020, Kapoor has been playing the role of a Lucknow based female cop S.I. Karishma Singh in Sony SAB's Maddam Sir alongside Gulki Joshi. In 2022, she also portrayed Kaushalya Singh, the twin-sister of her onscreen character Karishma Singh in Maddam Sir, in her third dual role.

Filmography

Television

Special appearances

Films

Music videos

Awards and nominations

See also 
 List of Indian television actresses
 List of Hindi television actresses

References

External links

 

21st-century Indian actresses
Indian television actresses
Living people
Year of birth missing (living people)